Lakshay Sheoran is an Indian sport shooter. He won silver medal in trap shooting at the 2018 Asian Games.

Early life and career
Sheoran was born in Jind, Haryana, on 4 November 1998. Son of former wrestling national champion Somveer pehalwan, Sheoran started training for shooting in 2014. He initially started air pistol shooting, but later switched to shotgun shooting after visiting Dr. Karni Singh Shooting Range.

Representing Haryana state, he became national junior champion in the 2016 National Shooting Championships after defeating Manavaditya Singh Rathore of Rajasthan in the men's trap event. He won his second junior national title in 2017 after defeating Rajasthan's Vivaan Kapoor by 41-39.

At the 2017 ISSF Junior World Cup in Italy, Sheoran was paired with Manisha Keer for the mixed team event. The pair scored 84 out of 100 to qualify for the final round. In the final, they won bronze medal after defeating Sevin Edward Layer and Emma Lee Williams of United States by 34–33. Paired with Vivaan Kapoor and Ali Aman Elahi for the men's trap team event at the 2018 ISSF Junior World Cup, he won bronze medal after the trio scored 328. The gold and silver medallist teams of China and Australia scored 335 and 331 respectively. He achieved country's apex ranking in trap shooting after defeating Manavjit Singh Sandhu and Kynan Chenai in the trials for 2018 Asian Games.
 
At his maiden appearance in the Asian Games in 2018, he won silver medal (with a score of 43) after losing to Chinese Taipei's Yang Kun-pi's world record-equalling score of 48 in the final. He is one of the three Asian Games silver medallists in the men's trap event from India – the other two being Karni Singh (in 1974) and Manavjit Singh Sandhu (in 2006).

References

1998 births
Living people
People from Jind
Indian male sport shooters
Sport shooters from Haryana
Medalists at the 2018 Asian Games
Asian Games silver medalists for India
Asian Games medalists in shooting
Shooters at the 2018 Asian Games